Samaris a 2013 Indian Tamil-language action thriller film written and directed by Thiru. It stars Vishal, Trisha and Sunaina, with Manoj Bajpayee and J. D. Chakravarthy appearing in supporting roles. Richard M. Nathan handled the cinematography, while the film's soundtrack and score were composed by Yuvan Shankar Raja and Dharan Kumar, respectively. Later on, it was dubbed in Hindi as Gabbar Sher in 2016. The story revolves around a trekking guide, who is forced to leave for Bangkok under strange circumstances and witnesses a series of puzzling incidents there. After several delays finally the film was released on 13 January 2013.

Plot
The film opens with Sakthi, son of a forest ranger, beating up a gang that illegally cuts precious trees to earn money. Sakthi is a jungle trekker who spends his time bringing groups of tourists on trips into the jungle.

Almost immediately, the story changes track and introduces Sakthi’s girlfriend, Rupa. The lovers soon part ways, citing compatibility issues where Rupa complains that Shakthi is not the loving boyfriend she wanted. Sakthi's character is as such that he does not remember even a single detail in their love life that Rupa deems important. Rupa tells Sakthi that he does not seem to have the time for a girlfriend and that he does not even care to do so. Rupa further aggravates the situation by asking Sakthi to close his eyes and tell her the colour of the dress she was wearing right then, but Sakthi finds that he could not. Grieved, Rupa leaves Sakthi, saying this was his character and that he would not change.

After three months, Sakthi still had not recovered from his break-up. However, he receives a courier from his girlfriend saying that she misses him, and a flight ticket to Bangkok, where she resides now. Sakthi is overjoyed and leaves for Bangkok. Being his first trip to a foreign country, Sakthi seeks help from his co-passenger Maya. They end up becoming friends, and Sakthi tells Maya about his lady love.

In Bangkok's Suvarnabhumi Airport, Sakthi and Maya part ways, and Sakthi makes his way to the Buddhist Temple where Rupa had written in the letter that she would meet him at. Although he waits for hours, Rupa doesn't turn up. At night, IPS Officer Muthumaran checks on him, saying that he wasn't allowed to stay at the temple at night. Upon learning that Sakthi is a Tamilian just like himself, he offers him a place to stay while Sakthi finds his girlfriend. However, Muthumaran does imply that he does not trust women and that Sakthi should not get his hopes up high that Rupa will come looking for him. Another day, in a case of mistaken identity, Sakthi gets caught up in the middle of a shootout between two gangs, one intent on protecting him and the other seemingly hell-bent to riddle him full of holes. As the gang protecting Sakthi gain the upper hand in the firefight, they whisk him away to a posh hotel in a luxury car. Sakthi is confused and doesn’t understand why he was dragged off.

A magazine in the seat next to him in the car attracts his attention, and to his shock, Sakthi sees an exact look-alike on the cover of the magazine. It turns out that his doppelgänger, remarkably also named Sakthi, is a multi-millionaire tycoon who is adored by many and targeted by a few in Bangkok. He doesn’t know how to prove his identity as everything stands against him. Things get bizarre as Trekker Sakthi has been forcefully dropped into the role of Tycoon Sakthi and situations seem to prove him as someone he was not.

In the hotel, Trekker Sakthi argues with the Tycoon Sakthi's personal assistant Manohar about his true identity. He takes out his passport and shows it to Manohar. An amused Manohar gives the passport back to Trekker Sakthi and asks if it was true that he was merely the son of a forest ranger, why would he have multiple visas of so many countries, which was expected in a businessman's passport. To his horror, Trekker Shakthi finds that his ordinary, rarely travelled Indian passport has inexplicably turned into a Thai passport with visas to several countries like Australia, New Zealand and the United States. Sakthi enlists the help of Maya, who brings him to a branch of Bangkok Bank to recover his details, hoping there would be a discrepancy somewhere to help Trekker Sakthi prove he was not Tycoon Sakthi.

In a turn of events, when Trekker Sakthi signs his signature to access the Tycoon's bank account balance hoping that his different signature might be proof enough, the bank's security system shows that his signature was an exact match – and that he had a little over half a billion US dollars in his account. At this juncture, even Maya starts to suspect that both Sakthis are the same person. Sakthi gets further and further mangled in more trouble with his assumed identity.

After a long cat and mouse game, Sakthi spots Manohar again, not in a business suit as before, but as a pimp in the streets. Sakthi gives chase and beats him up enough to find out the truth – that he was being played by two ruthless, psychotic businessmen watching his every move through hidden cameras, who have orchestrated all the bizarre situations Sakthi had found himself in before Manohar reveals the names he is shot and falls into the hole. Shakthi is blamed for the murder, and the police do not believe his situation. Shakthi learns that Rupa had never written the letter. Two business tycoons, Rajesh Arunachalam and John Frederick, happen to be friends from childhood, born in rich families. They play a game creating problematic situations intentionally for unsuspecting people choosing randomly placing bets on them to determine whether they survive or not.

In present, both villains bring a person posing as Maya's boyfriend Rohit to provoke the anger of Sakthi so that he would show his anger towards Maya. Sakthi plays the same game back at the villains with Maya, by pretending to slap and kill her (two villains think that Maya is really dead). Maya stands on a road where villains were travelling, and they think she is a ghost, they panic, lose control of the car and become unconscious. The next day, Rajesh and John find themselves staying in a suite owned by them, and a news broadcast shocks them – to the whole world, John and Rajesh are dead, and their funeral is taking place. They run away and end up before Shakthi and Maya. Joseph Kuriyan, Muthumaran, and Jayaraj, the people who were involved in the game, arrive there, and the film ends with Shakthi and Maya walking away from the seaside while the sound of a pistol is heard, which indicates that both villains are killed.

Cast

 Vishal as Sakthi
 Trisha as Maya
 Sunaina as Roopa
 Manoj Bajpayee as Rajesh Arunasalam
 J. D. Chakravarthy as John Frederick
 Jayaprakash as Joseph Kuriyan
 Sampath Raj as Muthumaran
 John Vijay as Manohar
 Sriman as Jayaraj
 Narayan as Rohit (Maya's boyfriend)
 Azhagam Perumal as Sakthi's father
 Rajendran as Tree Cutter
 Uma Padmanabhan
 Munnar Ramesh
 Sandra Amy
 Chevvalai Rasu
 Saran Shakthi as young Rajesh 
 Scarlett Mellish Wilson as an item girl in "Rajaavin Thoattathil"

Production

Development
In mid-August 2011, Vishal confirmed that his next project after Vedi would be a film to be directed by Thiru, with whom he had collaborated in Theeradha Vilaiyattu Pillai before. He went on to add that the same technical crew of Theeradha Vilaiyattu Pillai, including its music composer Yuvan Shankar Raja, would be retained for the film, and that it would be completed within four months. The film was titled as Samaran in the first September week, and was reported to be an action adventure film, with Vishal playing a "forest trekker". The film's title was changed to Samar in April 2012. At the audio release function, Vishal revealed that the film was written for his friend, actor Arya, but that he wanted to enact the lead role after listening to its narration. The first look of the film was unveiled by Thiru on 1 May 2012 via Twitter.

Casting
Trisha, who had previously declined four of Vishal's films -Sathyam, Thoranai, Theeradha Vilayattu Pillai and Vedi— was signed as the female lead few days later. It was widely reported that Arvind Swamy had agreed to essay a negative character in the film, however Thiru informed that Arvind Samy was considered but never approached, adding that it was not a negative character either. Arvind Swamy later clarified that he was not going to make a comeback, and Prakash Raj was signed for that character. Sneha Ullal was supposed to play a prominent role in the film, which was eventually secured by Sunaina. As the filming became delayed by a month, Prakash Raj opted out of the project and was subsequently replaced by Manoj Bajpai, making his Tamil film debut, while J. D. Chakravarthy was recruited to play another pivotal role.

Filming
The director stated that it would be filmed on location in the forests of Chalakudy, Kerala while few portions were planned to be shot in China. Most of the scenes from schedule one were canned in Ooty and featured only Vishal and Sunaina. The team left for Thailand on 20 December 2011 for a nonstop 50-day schedule, following which the last schedule was to be in famous locales of Europe and
includes an action sequence in there as well. Several stunt scenes were shot in Bangkok with the help of Chinese stuntman Nung, which Vishal performing without using any safety ropes. The song "Poikaal Kuthirai", picturised on Vishal, was shot for over five days in almost 18 locations in Bangkok. In October 2012, the crew left for Malaysia to shoot the last song on Vishal and Trisha.

Music

The soundtrack was composed by Yuvan Shankar Raja, continuing his association with director Thiru. The album features five tracks, lyrics for which were penned by Na. Muthukumar and Kabilan. It was released on 4 December 2012 at Prasad Labs, with Na. Muthukumar and director Agathiyan, Thiru's father-in-law, being present at the event, among other media personalities. Yuvan Shankar Raja was in Kuala Lumpur, mastering the sound for the film, and hence could not attend the event. Trisha and Sunaina also missed the event as they were busy with their current projects. The film's score was composed by Dharan Kumar.

The album received a positive critical response. Musicperk.com rated the album 6.5/10, quoting "This album is a treat for Yuvan fans". Milliblog wrote: "Samar is proof that Yuvan can doze off while composing". Behindwoods wrote: "The album, on the whole, is a collection of new sounds, that are dark and sometimes jarring, and generic tunes that lack the spark that Yuvan showed with his earlier releases".

Controversy

The film ran into legal troubles over the title. A producer named Vijay brought an interim injunction over the usage of the title, Samar, claiming that he had registered the same at the Film and TV Producers Association and the South Indian Film Chamber of Commerce the year before for his upcoming film. The court ordered an interim injunction Samar and gave a deadline till 31 August to reply. Director Thiru confirmed by October 2012 that the title issue had been solved and that the film's title will remain.

Director Thiru, after the release of the film, lashed out at a major production house, alleging that it tried to stall the release of his film for Pongal.

Release

Theatrical
The satellite rights of the film were secured by Zee Tamil. The film was supposed to release for the Christmas weekend on 21 December. It was pushed to 28 December since the film was not censored yet. Due to "severe financial problems", it was postponed again to January 2013, to release on Pongal day. The film was censored on 22 December and was awarded with an "U/A" certificate by the Central Board of Film Certification. Samar released on 13 January 2013 across 1600 screens worldwide alongside the comedy flick Kanna Laddu Thinna Aasaiya.

Reception

Box office
The film got a very good opening 60% - 75% occupancy on first day collected 36.5 crore.  the mixed talk from public didn't affect its collection at the box office. By weekend, the film grossed 37.14 crore at the box office. In Chennai, the film grossed 1.25 crore in first week.

Critical response
Samar received mixed reviews. Sify's critic wrote, "a suspense thriller that is intelligently structured, Vishal’s Thiru directed Samar is an all-new experience for Tamil commercial cinema viewers", with the reviewer going on to add that it was not "what one would rate as great cinema but we assure it has enough zing, visual and thrills to keep you in your seats for its runtime of a little over two hours". Vivek Ramz from in.com rated it 3 out of 5 and stated, 'Samar' has an interesting storyline, but is somewhat let down in its treatment. Still, it’s watchable, especially for those who love suspense and thrills. M. Suganth from The Times of India gave the film 3.5 stars out of 5 and claimed, Samar is an engaging film that is quite a different attempt for Tamil cinema (Hollywood routinely comes up with such thrillers) and Thiru deserves a pat for confidently exploring this slightly tricky genre and managing to succeed in it. Rediff's Pavithra Srinivasan gave it 3 out of 5 and cited that it "manages to wring out a tale that's entertaining and snappy, despite its flaws", further adding that "it is slick, makes you get involved with the characters, and doesn't let you pause until almost the end", and calling it an "ideal festival fare". Deccan Chronicle stated that Samar was a "neat thriller with an interesting plot and a good script". Oneindia.in gave 3 stars out of 5 and wrote, "the strength of the film is the screenplay, which thrills you with every twist. The first half of Samar is brilliant and the second half is cleverly narrated", describing it as a "must-watch movie for action lovers". Behindwoods gave the film 2.5 out of 5 and cited that director Thiru "has given a movie which has the right intentions, begins well and incites your interest at the halfway point. But, once the knots are untied, the end feeling is that it could have been a greater product", concluding that it was a "watchable suspense flick which could have been better".

References

External links
 

Films shot in Ooty
2013 films
2013 action thriller films
2010s mystery thriller films
Indian action thriller films
Indian action adventure films
Indian mystery thriller films
Films shot in Thailand
Films shot in Malaysia
Films scored by Yuvan Shankar Raja
Films directed by Thiru (director)
2010s Tamil-language films
Films shot in Chalakudy
2010s action adventure films
Films shot in Thrissur